This is a list of independent MSPs. It includes all Members of the Scottish Parliament (MSPs) who sat as independent politicians in the Scottish Parliament.

, only three people have ever been elected to the Scottish Parliament as independent candidates. Dennis Canavan and Jean Turner were independents throughout their time in the Parliament. Margo MacDonald was elected in 1999 as a Scottish National Party (SNP) candidate, but sat as an independent after her expulsion in early 2003, and was re-elected three times as an independent candidate.

The other nine MSPs who sat as independents did so after leaving the party for which they had been elected.  Some resigned from their party, and others were suspended or expelled. Margo MacDonald was the only former party MSP to win re-election as an independent, but John Finnie was re-elected in 2016 as a Scottish Greens candidate.

List of MSPs

Notes

References

External links
 Current and previous Members of the Scottish Parliament (MSPs), on the Scottish Parliament website

Independent
List
Scottish Parliament